Point Bonita Lighthouse is a lighthouse located at Point Bonita at the San Francisco Bay entrance in the Marin Headlands near Sausalito, California. Point Bonita was the last manned lighthouse on the California coast. It was added to the National Register of Historic Places in 1991.

History
More than 300 boats ran aground near the Golden Gate during the California Gold Rush years, requiring a lighthouse.

This was too high. Unlike the East Coast of the United States, the West Coast has dense high fog, which leaves lower elevations clear. Since the original light was so high, it was often cloaked in fog and could not be seen from the sea.

The lighthouse had the first fog signal on the West Coast, in the form of a 24-pounder siege gun.

Up until 1940 the lighthouse could be reached by a trail, but erosion caused the trail to crumble into the sea.  A wooden walkway was installed, but when that became treacherous a suspension bridge was built in 1954.  This is the only lighthouse in the United States which can only be reached by a suspension bridge.

The suspension bridge underwent repairs in 1979 and again in 1991, but the metal components were not able to stand up to the sea spray.  As a result, the suspension bridge to the light house was closed to public access on January 6, 2010.  According to the Federal Highway Administration, the bridge, which was 56 years old, had started to rust.  It was replaced by a new span which opened April 13, 2012.

The new bridge construction cost a little over $1 million. It is made of tropical hardwood with steel suspension cables and attachments.

The United States Coast Guard currently maintains the light and fog signal.

Public access
The lighthouse is accessible to the public during limited hours (12:30–3:30 p.m.) on Sundays and Mondays, as well as on ranger-led interpretive sunset hikes, which requires a sign-up.  Access to the bridge is barred at other times by a metal door on the shore end of the tunnel.

The lighthouse closed in March 2020 for the COVID-19 pandemic, but resumed tours two years later on February 20, 2022.

Gallery

In popular media
On the television show Murder in the First the lighthouse was a setting at the end of the second-season episode "Schizofrenzy".

The lighthouse can be found in the video game Watch Dogs 2.

See also

List of bridges documented by the Historic American Engineering Record in California
List of lighthouses in the United States

References

External links

Lighthousefriends.com entry (photos and history)
NPA Website about the light house

Lighthouses in the San Francisco Bay Area
Transportation buildings and structures in Marin County, California
Golden Gate National Recreation Area
Historic American Engineering Record in California
Lighthouses completed in 1855
Lighthouses on the National Register of Historic Places in California
National Register of Historic Places in Marin County, California
Sausalito, California
Tourist attractions in Marin County, California
1855 establishments in California